BR-392 is a federal highway in Rio Grande do Sul. The highway begins at the port town of Rio Grande in the south and runs north across the state, connecting the municipalities of Pelotas, Santa Maria, Santo Ângelo, and ending in Porto Xavier at the border with Argentina.

Gallery

References

Federal highways in Brazil